Mesa Geitonia is a municipality of Cyprus, located in the district of Limassol, 2 km north of the city center. It was established in 1986. Covering 370.71 hectares, it is the smallest municipality in Cyprus in area.

References 

Municipalities in Limassol District